The Benjamin Ellsworth House is a historic house in Utica, Minnesota, United States.  It was built in 1873 for Benjamin Ellsworth (1826–1890), the founder of Utica.  The building was listed on the National Register of Historic Places in 1984 for its local significance in the themes of architecture and exploration/settlement.  It was nominated for its associations with Ellsworth and for the degree of preservation of its original design.

See also
 National Register of Historic Places listings in Winona County, Minnesota

References

External links

1873 establishments in Minnesota
Houses completed in 1873
Houses in Winona County, Minnesota
Houses on the National Register of Historic Places in Minnesota
Italianate architecture in Minnesota
National Register of Historic Places in Winona County, Minnesota